Thiago Monteiro was the defending champion but chose not to defend his title.

Frances Tiafoe won the title after defeating Jérémy Chardy 6–3, 4–6, 7–6(7–5) in the final.

Seeds

Draw

Finals

Top half

Bottom half

References
Main Draw
Qualifying Draw

Open du Pays d'Aix - Singles
2017 Singles